Jérémy Roy (born May 14, 1997) is a Canadian professional ice hockey defenceman. He is currently playing with HC Vityaz in the Kontinental Hockey League (KHL). Roy was drafted with the 31st overall pick by the Sharks in the second round of the 2015 NHL Entry Draft.

Playing career

Junior
Roy was drafted by the Sherbrooke Phoenix 4th overall in the 2013 QMJHL Entry Draft. In his first season with Sherbrooke he was named to the 2013–14 QMJHL All-Rookie Team and awarded the Raymond Lagacé Trophy as the league's Defensive Rookie of the Year. The following season his outstanding play was rewarded when he was chosen to skate in the 2015 CHL/NHL Top Prospects Game.

Professional
On September 13, 2015, Roy signed a three-year entry level contract with the San Jose Sharks.

At the conclusion of his entry-level contract, with his tenure within the Sharks largely affected through injury, Roy as an impending restricted free agent was not tendered a qualifying offer by San Jose and was released to free agency on October 9, 2020.

Un-signed leading into the pandemic delayed 2020–21 season, Roy was signed to a professional try-out contract with the San Diego Gulls of the AHL, the primary affiliate to the Anaheim Ducks, on January 13, 2021.

In the following 2021–22 season, Roy embarked on a European career in joining Slovakian club, HKM Zvolen of the Slovak Extraliga. Roy enjoyed a productive first season abroad, registering 8 goals and 33 points through 48 regular season games.

As a free agent, Roy opted to continue his career overseas, signing a one-year contract with Russian club, HC Vityaz of the KHL, on June 14, 2022.

International play
Roy won a gold medal as a member of Team Canada at the 2014 Ivan Hlinka Memorial Tournament, and also competed at the 2015 IIHF World U18 Championships where he led Team Canada to a bronze medal and was selected as one of Canada's Top 3 players.

Career statistics

Regular season and playoffs

International

Awards and honours

References

External links

1997 births
Living people
Blainville-Boisbriand Armada players
Canadian expatriate ice hockey players in the United States
Canadian ice hockey defencemen
San Diego Gulls (AHL) players
San Jose Barracuda players
San Jose Sharks draft picks
Sherbrooke Phoenix players
HC Vityaz players
HKM Zvolen players
Canadian expatriate ice hockey players in Slovakia
Canadian expatriate ice hockey players in Russia